Vitula divergens is a species of snout moth. It was described by Harrison Gray Dyar Jr. in 1914. It is found in Panama.

References

Moths described in 1914
Phycitini